Elections to the European Advisory Council were held in Bechuanaland Protectorate in December 1930.

Electoral system
The European Advisory Council consisted of seven elected members, all of which were elected from single-member constituencies.

Voting was restricted to people who were British subjects of European descent, had lived in the protectorate for at least a year prior to the election and who also:
owned or leased land with a value of at least £200
owned stock used for farming with a value of over £200
held a general dealer's licence.
had an annual income over at least £200 from sources in the protectorate

Candidates were required to be nominated by five registered voters, and make a deposit of £25. The deposit was only refunded if they received more than 20% of the votes obtained by the winning candidate.

Results

Subsequent by-elections
During 1932, Robert Bailey (constituency 4) died and RH Linton (constituency 7) left the protectorate. In the by-elections held later in the year E Fodisch and RL Ciring were elected to replace them.

References

1930 elections in Africa
1930
1930 in Bechuanaland Protectorate
1930
1930 elections in the British Empire